Andreas Katzourakis is a Greek professional boxer.

Amateur career 
Katzourakis began competing in kickboxing at the age of 5 at the direction of his father, a former kickboxer. After competing in hundreds of amateur bouts in kickboxing and point fighting at both the national and international level, Karolina turned full athletic attention to boxing at 15. Katzourakis had a brief career as an amateur boxer in Greece. As an amateur, he won 4 Greek National Championships and finished with a combined record of 21–0 with 16 forced stoppages within his home country.

Professional career 
Katzourakis made his professional debut in June 2018 at The Hangar in Costa Mesa, California, knocking out Chukwuka Willis in the first round of a scheduled four round bout. In only his fourth professional fight, Katzourakis took on former World Title challenger Walter Wright in Montebello, California. Katzourakis won this fight via unanimous decision, sweeping the scorecards over 6 rounds. In October 2022, Katzourakis took on veteran fighter Cameron Krael in Houston, Texas. Katzourakis won the fight via technical knockout after Krael's corner stopped the fight after 5 one-sided rounds.

Katzourakis is currently being coached by Ronnie Shields in Houston, Texas.

References

Living people
Greek people
Year of birth missing (living people)